Guy R. Williams (October 7, 1907 – December 31, 1992) was a Canadian Senator and Haisla First Nations leader and was, for a number of years, the only Native Canadian in the Senate. He was appointed on December 9, 1971, following the March 31, 1971 retirement of James Gladstone who had been called the first status Indian appointed to the upper house. In fact Williams appears to be the very first First Nations Senator, because Senator Gladstone was only adopted onto the Blood reserve and he was ineligible to be on the Indian Register.

Williams was born on a Native reserve of Kitamaat Village, British Columbia, Canada. He worked for a time in a mill, before becoming a fisherman and then starting his own boat-building business.

Williams was a member of the Haisla Nation of British Columbia.  He was president of the Native Brotherhood of British Columbia for twelve years until his appointment to the Senate.

References

External links
 
 http://parl.canadiana.ca/view/oop.debates_SOC2804_01/57?r=0&s=1 maiden speech 
 https://lop.parl.ca/sites/ParlInfo/default/en_CA/People/Profile?personId=6615

academic article with real information about heritage of Gladstone. https://muse.jhu.edu/article/573325/pdf

1907 births
1992 deaths
20th-century First Nations people
Canadian senators from British Columbia
First Nations politicians
Haisla people
Indigenous Canadian senators
Liberal Party of Canada senators